The 2017 Rugby Championship was the sixth edition of the expanded annual southern hemisphere Rugby Championship, featuring Argentina, Australia, South Africa and New Zealand. The competition is operated by SANZAAR, a joint venture of the four countries' national unions.

The tournament started on 19 August with Australia hosting reigning champions New Zealand and South Africa hosting Argentina. The tournament ran for eight weeks with two bye weeks, ending on 7 October when New Zealand visited South Africa and Australia played in Argentina.

Background
The tournament is operated by SANZAAR and known for sponsorship reasons as The Castle Rugby Championship in South Africa, The Investec Rugby Championship in New Zealand, The Castrol Edge Rugby Championship in Australia and The Personal Rugby Championship in Argentina.

Format

The format for the 2017 tournament was similar to that of previous editions. Each side played the other once at home, and once away, giving a total of six matches each, and twelve in total. A win earned a team four league points, a draw two league points, and a loss by eight or more points zero league points. A bonus point was earned in one of two ways: by scoring at least three tries more than the opponent in a match, or by losing within seven points. The competition winner was the side with the most points at the end of the tournament.

Table

Results

Round 1

Notes:
 Curtis Rona (Australia) made his international debut.
 The 54 points scored by New Zealand is the most they have ever scored against Australia.	

Notes:
 Curwin Bosch (South Africa) made his international debut.
 Tendai Mtawarira (South Africa) earned his thirtieth consecutive Rugby Championship cap, breaking the record previously held by Bryan Habana (South Africa).

Round 2

Notes:
 Dane Coles (New Zealand) earned his 50th test cap.	
 Izack Rodda (Australia) made his international debut.	
 New Zealand retain the Bledisloe Cup.	

Notes:
 South Africa earn their first Rugby Championship bonus point victory in Argentina.

Round 3

Notes:
 Jordan Uelese (Australia) made his international debut.
 Tevita Kuridrani (Australia) earned his 50th test cap.
 This was the first draw between Australia and South Africa since their 14–14 draw in 2001.

Round 4

Notes:
 This is South Africa's biggest defeat in test rugby, surpassing the previous 50 point-margin set in the 2002 game against England.
 This is South Africa's largest-ever losing margin against New Zealand, surpassing the previous 42 point-margin set in the previous game at Durban.	
 New Zealand retain the Freedom Cup.

Notes:
 Marika Koroibete (Australia) made his international debut.

Round 5

Notes:
 Bernard Foley (Australia) earned his 50th test cap.
 Lukhan Tui (Australia) made his international debut.
 Australia retain the Mandela Challenge Plate.
 This marks the first time that Australia avoided defeat on South African soil in the Rugby Championship.

Notes:
 David Havili (New Zealand) made his international debut.

Round 6

Notes:
 Wilco Louw (South Africa) made his international debut.

Notes:
 This is the first time since the first and second round of the 2014 Rugby Championship, that the starting XV for Australia has remained the same in consecutive weeks, a career first for Michael Cheika.

Statistics

Points scorers

Try scorers

Current as of 30 September 2017.

Squads

Summary

Note: Ages, caps and clubs/franchises are of 19 August 2017 – the starting date of the tournament

Argentina
On 20 July 2017, Argentina named a 33-man squad for the Championship.

1 On 22 August, Felipe Arregui was added to the squad as injury cover for Nahuel Tetaz Chaparro who was injured in the opening round of the Championship.

Australia
On 19 July, Michael Cheika named a 38-man extended training squad ahead of the Championship. Brumbies players were left out of the initial squad with their involvement in the quarter-finals of the 2017 Super Rugby season.

On 26 July, Cheika added seven Brumbies players to the squad following their conclusion in the Super Rugby.

On 4 August, Cheika named Australia's final squad for the Championship, reducing the squad from 45 to 34. Jermaine Ainsley, Sam Carter, Pekahou Cowan, Sef Fa'agase, Richard Hardwick and Campbell Magnay missed out on the squad, while Karmichael Hunt, Tolu Latu, Eto Nabuli and Sefa Naivalu was omitted due to injury. Taniela Tupou still ineligible for international duty.

1 On 1 September, Tolu Latu was called up as cover for Stephen Moore, withdrew for personal reasons, ahead of the third-round game against South Africa.

2 On 7 September, Dane Haylett-Petty was ruled out for the rest of the Championship due to injury. He was later replaced by Tom Banks on the 10 September.

3 On 11 September, Lukhan Tui was added to the squad ahead of the fourth round, replacing Kane Douglas was dropped from the squad.

New Zealand
New Zealand's 34-man squad for the Championship. Damian McKenzie was named in the squad as a later replacement for Ben Smith who goes on a sabbatical following the opening two rounds.

1 On 10 August, Jordie Barrett withdrew from the squad due to injury and was replaced by David Havili.

2 On 13 August, Dane Coles was ruled out of the first round of the Rugby Championship and Ricky Riccitelli was called as cover.

3 On 20 August, Kane Hames, Akira Ioane and Atu Moli temporarily joined the squad ahead of the second round of the Championship.

4 On 24 August, Jeffery Toomaga-Allen was called up to the squad after Owen Franks was ruled out of the second-round game against Australia. Franks was later ruled out for the remainder of the Championship.

5 On 4 September, Blake Gibson was called up to the squad as injury cover for Sam Cane.

6 On 10 September, Joe Moody was ruled out for the remaining matches in the Championship and Kane Hames was recalled as his replacement.

7 On 18 September, Matt Todd and Patrick Tuipulotu were added to the squad for the final two rounds, away to Argentina and South Africa.

South Africa
On 5 August, coach Allister Coetzee named a 34-man squad for the Championship.

1 On 14 August, Ruan Dreyer was called up as injury cover for Frans Malherbe who could miss the whole Championship.

2 On 20 August, Jano Vermaak was called as injury cover for Ross Cronjé after Cronjé suffered an ankle injury in the opening round.

3 On 9 September, Coenie Oosthuizen was ruled our for the rest of the tournament after sustaining an injury in the third round. Wilco Louw was called up to replace him.

4 On 20 September, Francois Louw, S'busiso Nkosi and Louis Schreuder were added to the squad, with Louw and Schreuder replacing Jaco Kriel and Francois Hougaard in the squad.

See also
 History of rugby union matches between Argentina and Australia
 History of rugby union matches between Argentina and New Zealand
 History of rugby union matches between Argentina and South Africa
 History of rugby union matches between Australia and South Africa
 History of rugby union matches between Australia and New Zealand
 History of rugby union matches between New Zealand and South Africa

References

2017 in Argentine rugby union
2017 in Australian rugby union
2017 in New Zealand rugby union
2017 in South African rugby union
2017 rugby union tournaments for national teams
August 2017 sports events
October 2017 sports events
September 2017 sports events
2017